Fangcang hospital refers to a kind of makeshift/mobile field hospitals used during the COVID-19 pandemic in China.

History and usage
Such hospitals were intended for large-scale medical isolation and instituted either by establishing rapidly constructed modular/portable buildings, or through the acquisition of indoor space within existing venues and even temporarily renovated gyms and dorms in colleges and universities with enclosed cubicles to assist social distancing.

Chinese literature has mentioned the concept of "medical Fangcang" as early as 1989. China has constructed fangcang hospitals during the 2008 Sichuan earthquake and 2010 Yushu earthquake.

COVID-19 pandemic 
In Wuhan, at the onset of the COVID-19 pandemic in January 2020, general medical institutions and the newly expanded pneumonia specialist hospital were overwhelmed by the sudden surge in hospital bed demands by suspected COVID-19 cases. Many patients with existing conditions were also turned away, leading to deaths which were otherwise preventable. Authorities were criticized by experts and citizens alike. Meanwhile, the large number of low-severity cases — almost all are individuals with suspected or mild symptoms — still needed at least a fortnight of isolation (due to the incubation period of SARS-CoV-2).

Officials decided against home isolation for mild to moderate cases, as home isolation is not always properly complied with and it was difficult to organize medical care and monitoring for those in isolation. Furthermore, home isolation could be psychologically taxing on the patients as the patients know that they are putting their family members at risk of infection. On the other hand, in-hospital isolation will hold up medical resources and increase the risk of nosocomial exposure. Under such circumstances, the principle of centralized low-level care management of non-critical patients was adopted.  The Government of the People's Republic of China established 16 fangcang hospitals in Wuhan, providing a total of more than 20,000 beds.

As of March 10, 2020, all patients admitted to the square cabin hospital of Wuhan Wushan Hongshan Stadium were discharged. Thus, all 16 fangcang hospitals in Wuhan completed their missions and their cabins were shut down.

Etymology 
Fangcang, literally meaning "square cabin", is a Chinese term referring to a portable modular building structure formed using a combination of various solid materials, most notably cargotectures. The concept of "Fangcang" was borrowed from military field hospitals, which was initially introduced by the United States military, who has been making makeshift structures since the 1950s.

Outside of the context of the outbreak, makeshift or Fangcang structures can refer to many kinds of modular structures.

Locations in Wuhan 

The following Fangcang hospitals were in use in Wuhan during the COVID-19 pandemic:
 Wuhan International Conference & Exhibition Center, Jianghan District
 Hongshan Stadium, Wuchang District
 Wuhan Living Room, Dongxihu District
 Wuhan National Fitness Center, Jiang'an District
 Hongqiao Industrial Park, Jing'an District
 Wuhan Stadium, Qiaokou District
 Wuhan International Expo Center, Hanyang District
 Wuhan Sports Center Stadium, Wuhan Development Zone
 Shipailing Senior Vocational High School, Hongshan District
 Optics Valley Convention & Exhibition Center, Donghu Development Zone
 Wuhan Meilian Group’s former Rihai Industrial Park plant, Hongshan District
 Dahua Mountain Outdoor Sports Center, Jiangxia District
 Huangpi Stadium, Huangpi District
 WISCO Sports Center, Qingshan District
 Yangtze River Media Zhiyin Practice Training Base, Caidian District

Outside Mainland China 
The first comparable makeshift hospital built during Russia's outbreak was built at Golokhvastovo in suburban Moscow in March 2020. Similar makeshift hospitals were successively built in countries including Iran, Spain, United Kingdom and the United States.

In Singapore, isolation facilities which were repurposed existing large-scale facilities, like the Singapore Expo, are partially modelled after the Fangcang hospital design.

See also 
 Huoshenshan Hospital
 Leishenshan Hospital
 Dabie Mountain Regional Medical Centre
 COVID-19 hospitals in the United Kingdom

References

Further reading 
 
 
 

2020 establishments in China
Hospitals in China
Hospitals established for the COVID-19 pandemic